Vaasa is a city in Finland.

Vaasa may refer to:

 Vaasa Airport, located south-east of Vaasa city
 Vaasa Arena, located in Vaasa city
 Vaasa University of Applied Sciences, polytechnic university in Vaasa city
 Vaasa Oy, a former publishing and printing house now owned by Ilkka-Yhtymä Oyj
 Vaasa (electoral district), a constituency represented in the Finnish Eduskunta (parliament)
 Vaasa Province, a province of Finland disbanded in 1997
 Vaasa granite, a garnet-bearing granitoid 
 1507 Vaasa, an asteroid 
 Vaasa (Forgotten Realms), a fictional kingdom in Forgotten Realms

See also 
 Vasa (disambiguation)
 Vassa